Vittorio Grünwald (Verona, Italy, 13 June 1855 – Florence, Italy, March 1943) was an Italian professor of mathematics and German language. His father Guglielmo (Willhelm) Grünwald (son of Aronne and Regina) was Hungarian, his mother Fortuna Marini (daughter of Mandolino Marini and Ricca Bassani) was Italian. In 1861 he moved to Hungary with his family, then came back in 1877 to Verona, later in November 1885 they moved to Brescia, and then to Venice. He studied at the Technische Universität Wien, where he graduated in mathematics. After coming back to Italy, he taught mathematics and German language in several schools (such as in Livorno and Venice), and then he settled in Florence.

He married Dora Olschky, born in Berlin, and had three kids: Marta Grünwald, Beniamino (Benno) Grünwald, and Emanuele Grünwald.

He was a librarian and a teacher at the Rabbinical College of Florence. He died at 88 in Florence, a few months before Nazi's persecutions hit Jewish families in Central Italy. He published several contributions in mathematics, including a seminal work on negative numerical bases. He also published an Italian-German vocabulary.

References
 Vittorio Grünwald. Saggio di aritmetica non decimale con applicazioni del calcolo duodecima/e e trigesimale a problemi sui numeri complessi (Verona, 1884)
 Vittorio Grünwald. Intorno all'aritmetica dei sistemi numerici a base negativa con particolare riguardo al sistema numerico a base negativo-decimale per lo studio delle sue analogie coll'aritmetica ordinaria (decimale), Giornale di Matematiche di Battaglini (1885), 203-221, 367
 Vittorio Grünwald and Garibaldi Menotti Gatti, Vocabolario delle lingue Italiana e Tedesca. Ed. Belforte.
 Gianfranco Di Segni, In ricordo del prof. Vittorio Grünwald, Firenze Ebraica, Anno 25 n. 5, Settembre-Ottobre 2012.

1855 births
1943 deaths
Italian mathematicians
Scientists from Verona